1987 ACC tournament may refer to:

 1987 ACC men's basketball tournament
 1987 ACC women's basketball tournament
 1987 ACC men's soccer tournament
 1987 Atlantic Coast Conference baseball tournament